Cornelius G. Kennefick (born 1958), known as Niall Kennefick, was an Irish hurler who played at club level with St Finbarr's and at senior inter-county level with the Cork county team. He usually lined out as a defender.

Career
Kennefick first came to hurling prominence with the St Finbarr's club. After progressing through the juvenile and underage ranks he eventually progressed onto the club's senior team which coincided with a hugely successful era for the club. He won an All-Ireland Club Championship title in 1979, while he also won a club joint-record of six Cork SHC titles. Kennefick first appeared at inter-county level during an unsuccessful two-year tenure with the Cork under-21 hurling team. He joined the Cork senior hurling team during their successful 1980-81 National League campaign and was later an unused substitute in the Munster Championship.

Personal life
Kennefick's father, Mick Kennefick, captained Cork to victory over Antrim in the 1943 All-Ireland final. His grandfather, Dan Kennefick, was part of the Cork team beaten by Kilkenny in the 1912 All-Ireland final. Kennefick's brother-in-law, Jimmy Barry-Murphy, was a dual All-Ireland-winner with Cork.

Honours
St Finbarr's
All-Ireland Senior Hurling Championship: 1978
Munster Senior Hurling Championship: 1977, 1980
Cork Senior Hurling Championship: 1977, 1980, 1981, 1982, 1984, 1988

Cork
National Hurling League: 1980-81

References

1958 births
Living people
St Finbarr's hurlers
St Finbarr's Gaelic footballers
Cork inter-county hurlers